The Moto Z3 Play (stylized as Moto z³ Play by Motorola) is an Android smartphone developed by Motorola Mobility, as the successor to the Moto Z2 Play. It shares most of its features with the Moto Z3, but uses a SD636 SOC instead of a SD835.

Reception 
The phones features were generally liked. Its high price compared to competitors was cited as its major weakness.

References 

Android (operating system) devices
Motorola mobile phones
Mobile phones introduced in 2018
Motorola smartphones